Franz Anton Menge (15 February 1808 in Arnsberg – 27 January 1880 in Danzig) was a German entomologist.
 
Menge was a student of Physics, Chemistry and Natural History at the University of Bonn He became professor at the Petrischule in Danzig.
Menge published Preussische Spinnen or Spiders of Prussia between 1866 and 1878.

His collection of insects and spiders is in the State Natural History Museum in Gdańsk. It includes many fossil insects preserved in Baltic amber.

Works 
 Catalogus plantarum phanerogamicarum regionis Grudentinensis et Gedanensis. Typis C. G. Böthe, Grudentiae 1839
 Verzeichniss Danziger Spinnen. Danzig 1850
 Preussische Spinnen. Part I.–XI. Schriften der Naturforschenden Gesellschaft in Danzig. Danzig 1866–1878

References 

German entomologists
1808 births
1880 deaths
University of Bonn alumni
German arachnologists
19th-century German zoologists